
Year 235 BC was a year of the pre-Julian Roman calendar. At the time it was known as the Year of the Consulship of Torquatus and Bulbus (or, less frequently, year 519 Ab urbe condita). The denomination 235 BC for this year has been used since the early medieval period, when the Anno Domini calendar era became the prevalent method in Europe for naming years.

Events 
 By place 
 Roman Republic 
 In Rome, the consul Titus Manlius Torquatus presides over the first ever closing of the gates of the Temple of Janus, signifying peace.

 Asia Minor 
 Under King Attalus I, Pergamum begins to build up its power and importance.
 Antiochus Hierax defeats his brother King Seleucus II Callinicus at the Battle of Ancyra.

 Greece 
 Aratus of Sicyon brings Megalopolis into the Achaean League.
 The ephor, Lysander, claims to have seen a sign from the gods against King Leonidas II of Sparta so Leonidas flees to avoid his trial. In his absence, Leonidas is deposed from the throne and replaced by his son-in-law, Cleomenes III.

 China 
 The exile Lü Buwei, facing the suspicion of Ying Zheng, commits suicide.

 By topic 
 Literature 
 A work by the Latin epic poet and dramatist Gnaeus Naevius is performed for the first time.

Births 
 Ellalan, king of the Anuradhapura Kingdom (d. 161 BC)

Deaths 
 Aristippus, Greek tyrant of Argos
 Lü Buwei, Chinese politician (b. 291 BC)

References